Nissan Maru was a Japanese cargo ship completed in 1939 owned by Nissan Kisen K.K. that was requestioned for service as an auxiliary collier and oiler by the Imperial Japanese Navy during World War II. She served with the 5th Fleet and was sunk by United States Army Air Forces bombers during the Japanese occupation of Kiska in the Aleutian Islands Campaign.

Building and civilian service 
The vessel was laid down on 30 June 1938 by the Osaka Iron Works at its shipyard for Nissan Kisen K.K.. Launched on 6 November of that year and named Nissan Maru, she was completed and registered at Tokyo on 15 January 1939. Nissan Maru was a 6,534 GRT cargo ship with a net register tonnage of 3,887. She was equipped with a direction finder, and had two decks with a cruiser stern. She had a length of 424.1 feet, a beam of 57.4 feet, and a depth of 34.4 feet. The ship was powered by two oil-burning Hitachi steam turbines double reduction geared to one screw shaft rated at 500 NHP.

On 19 July 1939, while steaming down the Whangpoo River at Shanghai, she suffered a twisted bow after colliding with the SS President Coolidge while the latter was tied up at a pier. No injuries occurred on either ship.

Military service 
On 9 September 1941, as Japan prepared to enter World War II, Nissan Maru was requisitioned by the Imperial Japanese Navy. She became an auxiliary collier and oiler attached to the Maizuru Naval District, homeported at Maizuru on 20 September. On the same day the auxiliary was assigned to the 5th Fleet, and Captain Sakuma Takao was appointed its supervisor. The vessel began conversion to military service on 24 September at the Osaka Iron Works shipyard; the conversion was finished on 15 October. On 25 November Sakuma was relieved by Captain Naotsuka Hachiro, and on the next day she departed Yokosuka. Nissan Maru spent the next months on duty around Hokkaido and the Kuriles, before arriving at Chichijima on 23 January 1942. On 28 January she returned to Yokosuka, before being assigned to supply the Aleutian Islands Campaign invasion force on 1 February.

On 7 March she was assigned to transport ammunition by the 5th Fleet, with an additional personnel transport mission being added on 17 March. In April she was fitted with fourteen Daihatsu-class landing craft, as well as a rangefinder and related equipment in May. On 5 May Nissan Maru was assigned to the operation for the seizure of Attu and Kiska; Naotsuka was relieved by Captain Ishii Saburo on 15 May. She arrived at Mutsu Bay in preparation for the invasion on 22 May, but was transferred to Kawauchi Bay on 26 May. She was briefly diverted to the Kuriles, and unloaded 200 tons of coal at Attu on 10 June. Nissan Maru arrived at Kiska on 12 June and unloaded her cargo.

At 08:30 on 15 June, still at Kiska, she was heavily damaged by several bomb hits during an airstrike of United States Army Air Forces Eleventh Air Force Boeing B-17 Flying Fortress and Consolidated B-24 Liberator heavy bombers, killing one crewman. She sank in Kiska Harbor at 07:00 on 19 June 1942 after being hit in a 05:00 air strike composed of three B-17s, four B-24s, and one Consolidated LB-30 from the Eleventh Air Force.  The mission that sank her was the first combat mission of the 36th Bombardment Squadron, led by Major Russell A. Cone. The wreck of the Nissan Maru was identified and filmed by the National Park Service's Submerged Cultural Resources Unit after the program began in 1989.

References

External links 

 wrecksite.eu page

1938 ships
Shipwrecks of the Alaska coast
Ships sunk by US aircraft
World War II shipwrecks in the Pacific Ocean
World War II auxiliary ships of Japan
Maritime incidents in June 1942
World War II merchant ships of Japan
Ships of the Aleutian Islands campaign
Ships built by Osaka Iron Works